The Île d'Orléans Bridge, known locally as the Pont de l'Île, is a suspension bridge that spans the Saint Lawrence River between the Beauport borough of Quebec City and Île d'Orléans (Orléans Island) in the Canadian province of Quebec. It is part of Quebec Route 368 and connects to Autoroute 40 on the north side.

The island was originally accessible only by ferry or by ice bridge during the winter. An electoral promise made by Premier Louis-Alexandre Taschereau to Montmorency County for a job-creation project during the Great Depression led to the construction of this bridge in 1934. It was completed in 1935 and initially named Taschereau Bridge.

The bridge, which uses under-deck trusses on the approaches to the main suspension-type span, is the farthest downstream of the Saint Lawrence River's fixed crossings, but it does not cross the entire river.

See also
List of bridges in Canada
List of crossings of the Saint Lawrence River

References

External links
Bridgemeister profile
 

Suspension bridges in Canada
Bridges completed in 1935
Bridges over the Saint Lawrence River
Bridges in Quebec City
Road bridges in Quebec
Canada geography articles needing translation from French Wikipedia